Ernie Rudduck (14 March 1884 – 4 September 1972) was an Australian rules footballer who played with Collingwood in the Victorian Football League (VFL).

Notes

External links 

Ernie Rudduck's profile at Collingwood Forever

1884 births
1972 deaths
Australian rules footballers from Victoria (Australia)
Collingwood Football Club players
Richmond Football Club (VFA) players